Theretra viridis is a moth of the family Sphingidae first described by Patrick Basquin in 1992. It occurs on São Tomé Island. The type locality is Bombaim.

The wingspan is about 40 mm. The forewing upperside ground colour is dark green. The fifth postmedian line is strongly developed and dentate on the veins, each vein highlighted by a short pale streak immediately basal to the line.

References

External links

Theretra
Moths described in 1992
Fauna of São Tomé Island